James Mackintosh (18 October 1827 – 9 May 1897) was a 19th-century Liberal Party Member of Parliament in Southland, New Zealand.

Early life
He was born in Lochinver, Sutherlandshire, Scotland, and went to Victoria, Australia as a young man with his father. At Moonee Ponds, he and his brother Murdoch Mackintosh were stock-breeders. The 1940 edition of the Dictionary of New Zealand Biography lists him as a representative of East Bourke in the Victoria Legislative Assembly, but this is incorrect and based on a confusion with the similarly named James Macintosh.

Mackintosh married Anne McLean in 1852. Her father owned the Pollio station on the Darling River.

Life New Zealand

The Mackintoshs moved to New Zealand in 1866, where he was also a runholder. He first bought the Strathmore estate in the Otautau district, and later the Gladfield estate. He retired from farming in 1884 and moved to Invercargill.

From 1880 until shortly before his death, Mackintosh was a member of the Southland Education Board. He set up the Aparima road board. While obituaries in The Evening Post (Wellington) and The Star (Christchurch) mention his membership of the Southland Provincial Council, his name does not appear on the council's roll compiled by Guy Scholefield in his 1950 edition of the New Zealand Parliamentary Record, 1840–1949. For a time, he was chairman of the Wallace County Council.

He was an advocate of cheap government loans for settlers.

Death
Annie Mackintosh died on 11 May 1880 in Invercargill. Mackintosh died on 9 May 1897, aged 69. He left seven sons and four daughters.

References

1827 births
1897 deaths
Burials at Eastern Cemetery, Invercargill
New Zealand Liberal Party MPs
Members of the New Zealand House of Representatives
New Zealand people of Scottish descent
New Zealand farmers
New Zealand MPs for South Island electorates
Unsuccessful candidates in the 1887 New Zealand general election
Unsuccessful candidates in the 1896 New Zealand general election
19th-century New Zealand politicians